The PalaOlimpia, also known as AGSM Forum or PalaSport Verona, is a multi-purpose arena in Verona, Italy.  It is home to the Scaligera Verona basketball team. In 2010, it hosted matches for the 2010 FIVB Men's World Championship. Its seating capacity is 5,350 spectators.

See also
 List of indoor arenas in Italy

External links
Arena information

Indoor arenas in Italy